The 1997 Pro Bowl was the NFL's all-star game for the 1996 season. The game was played on February 2, 1997, at Aloha Stadium in Honolulu, Hawaii. The final score was AFC 26, NFC 23. Mark Brunell of the Jacksonville Jaguars was the game's MVP.  In the game, Brunell threw for 236 yards.  He connected with the Oakland Raiders Tim Brown for an 80-yard touchdown to tie the game at 23 with only 44 seconds to go.

The referee was Larry Nemmers.

To date, this is the most recent Pro Bowl that went to overtime.

Roster

AFC (American Football Conference) Roster
Head coach
Tom Coughlin – Jacksonville

QB
Drew Bledsoe – New England
Mark Brunell – Jacksonville
John Elway – Denver
Vinny Testaverde – Baltimore

RB
Jerome Bettis – Pittsburgh
Terrell Davis – Denver
Curtis Martin – New England

FB
Kimble Anders – Kansas City

WR
Tim Brown – Oakland
Tony Martin – San Diego
Keenan McCardell – Jacksonville
Carl Pickens – Cincinnati

TE
Ben Coates – New England
Shannon Sharpe – Denver

OL
Bruce Armstrong – New England
Tony Boselli – Jacksonville
Ruben Brown – Buffalo
Dermontti Dawson – Pittsburgh
Bruce Matthews – Tennessee
Tom Nalen – Denver
Jonathan Ogden – Baltimore
Will Shields – Kansas City

DL
Chester McGlockton – Oakland
Neil Smith – Denver
Bruce Smith – Buffalo
Bryce Paup – Buffalo
Joel Steed – Pittsburgh
Ted Washington – Buffalo
Michael Sinclair – Seattle

LB
Levon Kirkland – Pittsburgh
Junior Seau – San Diego
Chris Slade – New England
Derrick Thomas – Kansas City

DB
Steve Atwater – Denver
Blaine Bishop – Tennessee
Ashley Ambrose – Cincinnati
Larry Whigham – New England
Rod Woodson – Pittsburgh
Dale Carter – Kansas City

K
Cary Blanchard – Indianapolis

P
Tom Rouen – Denver

NFC (National Football Conference) Roster
Head coach
Dom Capers – Carolina

QB
Kerry Collins – Carolina
Brett Favre – Green Bay
Gus Frerotte – Washington
Steve Young – San Francisco
Troy Aikman – Dallas

RB
Terry Allen – Washington
Barry Sanders – Detroit
Ricky Watters – Philadelphia

FB
Larry Centers – Arizona

WR
Cris Carter – Minnesota
Irving Fryar – Philadelphia
Herman Moore – Detroit
Rob Moore – Arizona
Michael Bates – Carolina

TE
Wesley Walls – Carolina
Keith Jackson – Green Bay

OL
Randall McDaniel – Minnesota
Larry Allen – Dallas
William Roaf – New Orleans
Tony Mayberry – Tampa Bay
Erik Williams – Dallas
Kevin Gogan – San Francisco

DL
John Randle – Minnesota
Warren Sapp – Tampa Bay
Michael Strahan – New York Giants
Reggie White – Green Bay
Dana Stubblefield – San Francisco
Chris Doleman – San Francisco

LB
Sam Mills – Carolina
Kevin Greene – Carolina
Lamar Lathon – Carolina
Jessie Armstead – New York Giants
Derrick Brooks – Tampa Bay
Jessie Tuggle – Atlanta
Hardy Nickerson – Tampa Bay
Ken Harvey – Washington

DB
Eric Davis – Carolina
Darren Woodson – Dallas
Deion Sanders – Dallas
Aeneas Williams – Arizona
Merton Hanks – San Francisco
Darrell Green – Washington

K
John Kasay – Carolina

P
Matt Turk – Washington

References

External links
 1997 Pro Bowl recap at ProBowlOnline.com

Pro Bowl
Pro Bowl
Pro Bowl
Pro Bowl
Pro Bowl
American football competitions in Honolulu
February 1997 sports events in the United States